South Korea was the host nation and competed as Korea at the 1988 Summer Olympics in Seoul. 401 competitors, 269 men and 132 women, took part in 218 events in 27 sports.

Medalists

Competitors
The following is the list of number of competitors in the Games.

Archery

Korea's third appearance in Olympic archery was even more successful than its previous one. The women's team was flawless, winning all three of the individual medals and the team gold. The men also won the team gold, with Park Sung-soo adding a fourth individual medal to bring the Koreans' total to six.

Women's Individual Competition:
 Kim Soo-nyung — Final (→  Gold Medal)
 Wang Hee-kyung — Final (→  Silver Medal)
 Yun Young-sook — Final (→  Bronze Medal)

Men's Individual Competition:
 Park Sung-soo — Final (→  Silver Medal)
 Chun In-soo — Final (→ 4th place)
 Lee Han-sup — Semifinal (→ 10th place)

Women's Team Competition:
 Kim, Wang, and Yun — Final → ( Gold Medal)

Men's Team Competition:
 Park, Chun, and Lee — Final → ( Gold Medal)

Athletics

Men's 10,000 metres
 Lee Sang-keun
 Heat — 29:37.14 (→ did not advance)

Men's Marathon
 Kim Won-tak
 Final — 2:15.44 (→ 18th place)

 Yoo Jae-sung
 Final — 2:20.11 (→ 31st place)

 Gwon Seong-nak
 Final — DNF

Men's 4 × 100 m Relay
 Sung Nak-kun, Shim Duk-sup, Kim Bock-sup, and Jang Jae-keun
 Heat — 39.61
 Semi Final — 39.43 (→ did not advance)

Men's 4 × 400 m Relay
 Hwang Hong-chul, Yoon Nam-han, Ryu Tae-keong, and Cho Jin-saeng
 Heat — 3:14.71 (→ did not advance)

Men's 3.000 m Steeplechase
 Cha Han-sik
 Heat — 8:59.82 (→ did not advance)

Men's Long Jump
 Kim Jong-il
 Qualification – 7.70m (→ did not advance)

Men's Hammer Throw
 Lee Joo-hyong
 Qualifying Heat — 55.98m (→ did not advance)

Men's Shot Put
 Han Min-soo
 Qualifying heat – 15.68m (→ did not advance)

Men's Discus Throw
 Min Se-hoon
 Qualifying heat – 47.84m (→ did not advance)

Men's Javelin Throw
 Lee Wook-jong
 Qualification — 78.10m (→ did not advance)

Men's Decathlon
 Lee Kwang-ik — 6917 points (→ 33rd place)
 100 metres — 11.57s
 Long Jump — 7.19m
 Shot Put — 10.27m
 High Jump — 1.91m
 400 metres — 50.71s
 110m Hurdles — 16.20s
 Discus Throw — 34.36m
 Pole Vault — 4.10m
 Javelin Throw — 54.94m
 1.500 metres — 4:29.98s

Men's 20 km Walk
 Chung Pil-hwa
 Final — 1:32:23 (→ 46th place)

 Jung Myong-oh
 Final — 1:40:09 (→ 49th place)

Women's 4 × 100 m Relay
 Yoon Mi-kyong, Woo Yang-ja, Park Mi-seon, and Lee Young-sook
 Heat — 45.83 (→ did not advance)

Women's 4 × 400 m Relay
 Yang Kyoung-hee, Choi Se-beom, Lim Chun-ae, and Kim Soon-ja
 Heat — 3:51.09 (→ did not advance)

Women's Marathon
 Lee Mi-ok
 Final — 2:32.51 (→ 15th place)

 Lim Eun-joo
 Final — 2:38.21 (→ 37th place)

 Kim Mi-gyeong
 Final — did not start (→ no ranking)

Women's Discus Throw
 Kim Chun-hee
 Qualification – 45.88m (→ did not advance)

Women's Javelin Throw
 Yoo Chun-ok
 Qualification – 48.26m (→ did not advance)

Women's Shot Put
 Choi Mi-seon
 Qualification — 13.97m (→ did not advance)

Women's Heptathlon
 Ji Jeong-mi
 Final Result — 5289 points (→ 24th place)

Basketball

Men's tournament

Team roster

Group play

Classification round 9–12

Classification round 9/10

Women's tournament

Team roster

Group play

Classification 5–8

Classification 7/8

Boxing

Canoeing

Cycling

Fifteen cyclists, eleven men and four women, represented South Korea in 1988.

Men's road race
 Park Hyeon-gon
 Lee Jin-ok
 Sin Dae-cheol

Men's team time trial
 Jo Deok-haeng
 Lee Jin-ok
 Park Hyeon-gon
 Yu Byeong-heon

Men's sprint
 Eom Yeong-seop

Men's 1 km time trial
 Eom Yeong-seop

Men's individual pursuit
 Park Min-su

Men's team pursuit
 An U-hyeok
 Jeong Jeom-sik
 Kim Yong-gyu
 Park Min-su

Men's points race
 Do Eun-cheol

Women's road race
 Kim Gyeong-suk
 No Yeom-ju
 Hong Yeong-mi

Women's sprint
 Kim Jin-yeong

Diving

Equestrianism

Fencing

20 fencers, 15 men and 5 women, represented South Korea in 1988.

Men's foil
 Kim Seung-pyo
 Go Nak-chun
 Kim Yong-guk

Men's team foil
 Hong Yeong-seung, Kim Seung-pyo, Kim Yong-guk, Go Nak-chun, Lee Yeong-rok

Men's épée
 Lee Sang-gi
 Yun Nam-jin
 Lee Il-hui

Men's team épée
 Jo Hui-je, Lee Il-hui, Lee Sang-gi, Yang Dal-sik, Yun Nam-jin

Men's sabre
 Lee Byeong-nam
 Kim Sang-uk
 Lee Uk-jae

Men's team sabre
 Kim Sang-uk, Lee Byeong-nam, Lee Hyo-geun, Lee Hyeon-su, Lee Uk-jae

Women's foil
 Tak Jeong-im
 Shin Seong-ja
 Park Eun-hui

Women's team foil
 Kim Jin-sun, Shin Seong-ja, Tak Jeong-im, Yun Jeong-suk, Park Eun-hui

Football

Gymnastics

Handball

Hockey

Men's team competition
 Preliminary round (group B)
 South Korea — Great Britain 2–2
 South Korea — Soviet Union 1–3
 South Korea — India 1–3
 South Korea — West Germany 0–1
 South Korea — Canada 1–1

 Classification Matches
 9th–12th place: South Korea — Kenya 5–2
 9th–10th place: South Korea — Spain 0–2 (→ Tenth place)

 Team roster
 (1.) Song Suk-chan
 (2.) Kim Yeong-jun
 (3.) Kim Jong-kap
 (4.) Chung Boo-jin
 (5.) Chung Kye-suk
 (6.) Kim Jae-chun
 (7.) Kwon Soon-pil
 (8.) Mo Ji-young
 (9.) Ji Jae-kwan
 (10.) Kim Man-whe
 (11.) Han Jin-soo
 (12.) Lee Heung-pyo
 (13.) Hur Sang-young
 (14.) Park Jae-sik
 (15.) Yoo Seung-jin
 (16.) Shin Suk-kyun
 Head coach: Yoo Seung-in

Women's Team Competition
 Preliminary round (group B)
 South Korea — West Germany 4–1
 South Korea — Canada 3–1 
 South Korea — Australia 5–5

 Semi Finals
 South Korea — Great Britain 1–0

 Final
 South Korea — Australia 0–2 (→ Silver Medal)

 Team roster
 (1.) Kim Mi-sun
 (2.) Han Ok-kyung
 (3.) Chang Eun-jung
 (4.) Han Keum-sil
 (5.) Choi Choon-ok
 (6.) Kim Soon-duk
 (7.) Chung Sang-hyun
 (8.) Jin Won-sim
 (9.) Hwang Keum-sook
 (10.) Cho Ki-hyang
 (11.) Seo Kwang-mi
 (12.) Park Soon-ja
 (13.) Kim Young-sook
 (14.) Seo Hyo-sun
 (15.) Lim Kye-sook
 (16.) Chung Eun-kyung
Head coach: Yoo Young-chae

Judo

Modern pentathlon

Three male pentathlete represented South Korea in 1988.

Men's Individual Competition:
 Kim Myeong-geon — 5099 pts, 12th place
 Gang Gyeong-hyo — 5074 pts, 13th place
 Kim Seong-ho — 3854 pts, 61st place

Men's Team Competition:
 Kim, Kang, and Kim — 14027 pts, 14th place

Rhythmic gymnastics

Rowing

Sailing

Shooting

Twenty two South Korean shooters (fourteen men and eight women) qualified to compete in the following events:
Men

Women

Open

Swimming

Men's 50 m Freestyle
 Song Kwang-sun
 Heat – 25.40 (→ did not advance, 54th place)

Men's 100 m Freestyle
 Kwon Sang-won
 Heat – 54.34 (→ did not advance, 55th place)
 Song Kwang-sun
 Heat – 54.63 (→ did not advance, 57th place)

Men's 200 m Freestyle
 Kwon Sang-won
 Heat – 1:56.88 (→ did not advance, 45th place)
 Kwon Soon-kun
 Heat – 1:58.95 (→ did not advance, 54th place)

Men's 400 m Freestyle
 Yang Wook
 Heat – 4:05.81 (→ did not advance, 39th place)
 Kwon Soon-kun
 Heat – 4:08.02 (→ did not advance, 42nd place)

Men's 1500 m Freestyle
 Yang Wook
 Heat – 16:21.10 (→ did not advance, 34th place)

Men's 100 m Backstroke
 Park Dong-pil
 Heat – 1:01.25 (→ did not advance, 40th place)

Men's 200 m Backstroke
 Park Dong-pil
 Heat – DSQ (→ did not advance, no ranking)

Men's 100 m Breaststroke
 Yoon Joo-il
 Heat – 1:04.68 (→ did not advance, 26th place)

Men's 200 m Breaststroke
 Yoon Joo-il
 Heat – 2:19.94 (→ did not advance, 22nd place)

Men's 100 m Butterfly
 Park Yeong-cheol
 Heat – 57.74 (→ did not advance, 38th place)

Men's 200 m Butterfly
 Park Yeong-cheol
 Heat – 2:08.57 (→ did not advance, 35th place)

Men's 200 m Individual Medley
 Lee Jae-soo
 Heat – 2:11.88 (→ did not advance, 35th place)

Men's 400 m Individual Medley
 Lee Jae-soo
 Heat – 4:40.46 (→ did not advance, 28th place)

Men's 4 × 100 m Freestyle Relay
 Kwon Sang-won, Yang Wook, Song Kwang-sun, and Kwon Soon-kun
 Heat – 3:38.05 (→ did not advance, 17th place)

Men's 4 × 200 m Freestyle Relay
 Kwon Sang-won, Yang Wook, Song Kwang-sun, and Kwon Soon-kun
 Heat – 7:52.93 (→ did not advance, 12th place)

Men's 4 × 100 m Medley Relay
 Park Dong-pil, Yoon Joo-Il, Park Yeong-cheol, and Kwon Sang-won
 Heat – 3:56.94 (→ did not advance, 21st place)

Women's 50 m Freestyle
 Han Young-hee
 Heat – 28.02 (→ did not advance, 34th place)
 Park Joo-li
 Heat – 28.20 (→ did not advance, 36th place)

Women's 100 m Freestyle
 Kim Eun-jung
 Heat – 1:00.39 (→ did not advance, 43rd place)
 Han Young-hee
 Heat – 1:01.72 (→ did not advance, 46th place)

Women's 200 m Freestyle
 Kim Eun-jung
 Heat – 2:10.85 (→ did not advance, 37th place)
 Park Joo-li
 Heat – 2:11.53 (→ did not advance, 39th place)

Women's 100 m Backstroke
 Hong Ji-hee
 Heat – 1:08.33 (→ did not advance, 30th place)

Women's 200 m Backstroke
 Hong Ji-hee
 Heat – 2:24.58 (→ did not advance, 26th place)

Women's 100 m Breaststroke
 Park Sung-won
 Heat – 1:12.32 (→ did not advance, 18th place)

Women's 200 m Breaststroke
 Park Sung-won
 Heat – 2:39.40 (→ did not advance, 29th place)

Women's 100 m Butterfly
 Lee Hong-mi
 Heat – 1:04.36 (→ did not advance, 26th place)
 Kim Soo-jin
 Heat – 1:06.14 (→ did not advance, 30th place)

Women's 200 m Butterfly
 Kim Soo-jin
 Heat – 2:19.00 (→ did not advance, 20th place)

Women's 4 × 100 m Freestyle Relay
 Kim Eun-jung, Han Young-hee, Park Joo-li, and Lee Hong-mi
 Heat – 4:03.18 (→ did not advance, 13th place)

Women's 4 × 100 m Medley Relay
 Hong Ji-hee, Park Sung-won, Lee Hong-mi, and Han Young-hee
 Heat – 4:28.90 (→ did not advance, 14th place)

Synchronized swimming

Three synchronized swimmers represented South Korea in 1988.

Women's solo
 Ha Su-gyeong
 Choi Jeong-yun
 Kim Mi-jinsu

Women's duet
 Ha Su-gyeong
 Kim Mi-jinsu

Table tennis

Tennis

Men's Singles Competition
 Kim Bong-soo
 First round — Defeated George Kalovelonis (Greece) 7–5, 3–6, 6–2, 6–7, 6–3
 Second round — Defeated Henri Leconte (France) 4–6, 7–5, 6–3, 3–6, 7–5
 Third round — Lost to Martín Jaite (Argentina) 4–6, 1–6, 3–6
 Yoo Jin-sun
 First round — Lost to Amos Mansdorf (Israel) 2–6, 4–6, 5–7
 Song Dong-wook
 First round — Lost to Tim Mayotte (USA) 3–6, 3–6, 4–6

Women's Singles Competition
 Lee Jeong-myung
 First Round – Bye
 Second Round – Lost to Catherine Suire (France) 5–7, 6–4, 5–7
 Kim Il-soon
 First Round – Defeated Etsuko Inoue (Japan) 6–3, 3–6, 7–5 
 Second Round – Defeated Helena Suková (Czechoslovakia) 6–2, 4–6, 6–2
 Third Round – Lost to Larisa Neiland (Soviet Union) 3–6, 6–7

Volleyball

Men's team competition
 Preliminary round (group A)
 Lost to Sweden (2–3)
 Defeated Brazil (3–2)
 Lost to Soviet Union (0–3)
 Lost to Bulgaria (0–3)
 Lost to Italy (0–3)

 Classification Matches
 9th/12th place: Lost to Japan (2–3)
 11th/12th place: Defeated Tunisia (3–0) → 11th place

 Team roster
 Choi Chon-sik
 Lee Sang-yul
 Chang Yun-chang
 Han Jang-sok
 Lee Seong-hui
 Kim Eun-sok
 Park Sam-yong
 Lee Myung-hak
 Kim Ho-chul
 Lee Chae-on
 Lee Jong-kyung
 Jung Eu-tak
 Head coach: Lee Kyu-so

Women's Team Competition
 Preliminary round (group A)
 Defeated East Germany (3–1)
 Lost to Soviet Union (0–3)
 Lost to Japan (1–3)

 Classification Matches
 5th/8th place: Lost to Brazil (2–3)
 7th/8th place: Lost to United States (2–3) → 8th place

 Team roster
 Park Mi-hee
 Kim Kyung-hee
 Kim Kui-soon
 Lim Hye-sook
 Yoo Young-mi
 Nam Soon-ok
 Yoon Chung-hye
 Park Bok-rye
 Kim Yoon-hye
 Sun Mi-sook
 Moon Sun-hee
 Ji Kyung-hee
 Head coach: Hwang Sung-on

Water polo

Men's team competition
 Preliminary round (group A)
 Lost to France (5–16)
 Lost to Italy (1–11)
 Lost to West Germany (2–18)
 Lost to Soviet Union (4–17)
 Lost to Australia (2–13)

 Classification Round (Group E)
 Lost to Greece (7–17)
 Lost to China (7–14) → Twelfth place

 Team roster
 Lee Jung-suk
 Chang Si-young
 Kim Sung-eun
 Yoo Seung-hoon
 Kim Ki-choon
 Kim Jae-yun
 Choi Sun-young
 Kim Kil-hwan
 Kim Jin-tae
 Song Seung-ho
 Hong Soon-bo
 Lee Taek-won
 Park Sang-won
 Head coach: Kim Jong-ku

Weightlifting

Wrestling

References

Korea, South
1988
1988 in South Korean sport